The 1970 NCAA University Division Golf Championship was the 32nd annual NCAA-sanctioned golf tournament to determine the individual and team national champions of men's collegiate golf in the United States.

The tournament was held at the Ohio State University Golf Club in Columbus, Ohio.

Defending champions Houston won the team title, the Cougars' twelfth NCAA team national title.

Individual results

Individual champion
 John Mahaffey, Houston

Team results

Note: Top 10 only
DC = Defending champions

References

NCAA Men's Golf Championship
Golf in Ohio
NCAA Golf Championship
NCAA Golf Championship
NCAA Golf Championship